Edward John Ikem Newton (born 13 December 1971) is an English football manager and former professional footballer.

As a player, he was a defensive midfielder from 1990 until 2001 notably for Chelsea where he scored in the 1997 FA Cup final. He also played in the Football League for Cardiff City, Birmingham City, Oxford United and Barnet and in the Conference National for Hayes. He also earned two caps for the England U21 side.

Having begun his coaching career on the staff of Milton Keynes Dons and West Bromwich Albion, he returned to Chelsea where he served as assistant manager to Roberto Di Matteo before the latter was replaced by Rafael Benítez. In December 2015 he was reappointed as assistant manager to interim manager Guus Hiddink. In 2020 he had a brief spell in charge of Turkish side Trabzonspor.

Playing career
Newton was born in Hammersmith, London. After making his way through the Chelsea youth system he was loaned out to Cardiff City in January 1992, making his debut in a 4–0 win over Chesterfield. Cardiff fell three points short of a play-off place and Newton returned to Chelsea. He played for Chelsea in the 1994 FA Cup Final, but his foul on Denis Irwin in the second half saw him cautioned and led to Manchester United receiving a penalty which was scored by Eric Cantona. He then made a defensive error which allowed United's Mark Hughes to make it 3–0.

Chelsea went on to lose 4–0 but United had won the double to qualify for the European Cup, allowing Chelsea to play European football for the first time since the 1970s with a place in the UEFA Cup Winners' Cup. Newton was part of the team that reached the semi-finals of the 1994–95 competition and also the semi-finals of the 1995–96 FA Cup.

Newton scored Chelsea's second, clinching, goal in the 1997 FA Cup Final to seal a 2–0 win over Middlesbrough. He won the Cup Winners' Cup and League Cup with the club a year later, but was thereafter hampered in his quest for a starting place by injuries and manager Gianluca Vialli's signing of French World Cup-winning midfielder Didier Deschamps.

He joined Birmingham City in July 1999 on a free transfer before spending short spells at various lower-league clubs, including Oxford United and Barnet. He retired due to a knee injury.

Management and coaching career

On 2 July 2008 Newton was appointed assistant manager to Roberto Di Matteo at Milton Keynes Dons. A year later, on 30 June 2009, Di Matteo was appointed head coach of West Bromwich Albion and it was reported that Newton would be joining him at the club as assistant head coach. When Di Matteo was relieved of his duties in January 2011, Newton also left the club.

On 5 March 2012 it was announced that Newton would be joining the back room staff at Chelsea, supporting Roberto Di Matteo. Di Matteo had just taken over as interim Head Coach at Chelsea following the departure of André Villas-Boas. In his short time as assistant manager at Chelsea he has won the UEFA Champions League and FA Cup. He currently helps to oversee the progress of Chelsea's loan players after having been assistant first team coach under Guus Hiddink in for the second half of the previous season. Following the departure of Hiddink, Newton returned to the loan technical coach role until 2019, when he became an assistant coach to the first team following the appointment of Frank Lampard as head coach.

He was appointed assistant manager at Trabzonspor in February 2020.

On 2 August 2020, Newton was appointed by Trabzonspor on a permanent basis, after a successful period as caretaker winning the Turkish Cup. On 31 October 2020, he was sacked as the club's manager after winning just one of his seven games in charge.

Personal  life
Born in England, Newton is of Nigerian/Jamaican descent.

Managerial statistics

Honours

Player
Chelsea
FA Cup: 1996–97
Football League Cup: 1997–98
UEFA Cup Winners' Cup: 1997–98
UEFA Super Cup: 1998

Assistant Manager
Chelsea
FA Cup: 2011–12
UEFA Champions League: 2011–12

Manager
Trabzonspor
Turkish Cup: 2019–20

References & notes

1971 births
Living people
Footballers from Hammersmith
Association football midfielders
English footballers
England under-21 international footballers
Chelsea F.C. players
Cardiff City F.C. players
Birmingham City F.C. players
Oxford United F.C. players
Barnet F.C. players
Hayes F.C. players
Premier League players
English Football League players
National League (English football) players
English football managers
Trabzonspor managers
Milton Keynes Dons F.C. non-playing staff
West Bromwich Albion F.C. non-playing staff
Chelsea F.C. non-playing staff
English people of Nigerian descent
Black British sportsmen
Converts to Islam
British Muslims
FA Cup Final players